The Undercover Policing Inquiry or Pitchford Inquiry is an independent public inquiry into undercover policing in England and Wales. It was announced by Theresa May, the United Kingdom Home Secretary on 12 March 2015, and is due to report back in 2023. It is chaired by Sir John Mitting, following the resignation due to ill-health of Lord Justice Pitchford. In March 2018 campaigners and their legal team walked out of a hearing of the inquiry, calling for Mitting to step down.

Background  
Theresa May commissioned the Undercover Policing Inquiry in 2015, in response to a string of allegations about the activities of undercover units, including the disclosure that police had spied on campaigners fighting for justice for Stephen Lawrence.

In 2012 Theresa May had commissioned Mark Ellison QC to review allegations of corruption relating to the initial police investigation of the 1993 murder of Lawrence. The Ellison Report, presented to Parliament on 6 March 2014, found a number of serious concerns relating to undercover policing practices. Ellison also highlighted a possible link between an allegedly corrupt police officer involved in the Lawrence campaign, and the 1987 murder of private investigator Daniel Morgan.

Remit 
The inquiry is investigating the undercover infiltration of more than 1,000 political groups since 1968. It primarily examines the conduct of two now disbanded units: the Metropolitan Police's Special Demonstration Squad (SDS) and the National Public Order Intelligence Unit (NPOIU). It is looking at allegations that undercover officers infiltrated and disrupted social justice groups and movements, deceived women into intimate relationships, stole the names of dead children to create fake identities, and concealed evidence in court cases.

Evidence 
As of April 2018 the inquiry has confirmed that undercover police had infiltrated the following groups and movements:

Anarchist groups, Animal Liberation Front, Anti-Apartheid Movement, Anti-Fascist Action, Big Flame, Black Power movement, Brixton Hunt Saboteurs, Anglia Ruskin Churchill Society (Young Conservatives), Colin Roach Centre, Dambusters Mobilising Committee, Dissent!, Earth First!, Essex Hunt Saboteurs, Friends of Freedom Press Ltd, Globalise Resistance, Independent Labour Party, Independent Working Class Association, International Marxist Group, International Socialists, Irish National Liberation Solidarity Front, London Animal Action, London Animal Rights Coalition, London Boots Action Group, London Greenpeace, Militant, No Platform, Antifa, Operation Omega, Reclaim the Streets, Red Action, Republican Forum, Revolutionary Socialist Students Federation, Socialist Party (England and Wales), Socialist Workers Party, South London Animal Movement (SLAM), Tri-Continental, Troops Out Movement, Vietnam Solidarity Campaign, West London Hunt Saboteurs, Workers Revolutionary Party, Young Haganah, Young Liberals, Youth against Racism in Europe.

The Undercover Research Group has published an extensive list of known spycops and the groups they spied upon.

Tranche 1, Phase Hearings of the inquiry took place in November 2020 and took evidence about the SDS  between 1968-1972 from non-state witnesses and undercover police officers. The inquiry started hearing evidence on 2 November 2020, with seven days of opening statements then seven days of evidence hearings. The hearings were conducted remotely due to the COVID-19 pandemic. The inquiry was to focus on the deployment of about 140 undercover police officers to spy on over 1,000 political groups over more than 40 years.  Tranch1, Phase 2 Hearings in April and May 2021 heard evidence about SDS activities between 1970-1979.  In May 2022, Tranche ,1 Phase 3, the inquiry mainly heard evidence from SDS police managers over the period 1968-1982.   In July 2022 the Inquiry said they would issue an intermediate report but had not yet done so.  Tranche 2 Hearings were scheduled for the Spring of 2024 and Hearings were expected to continue beyond 2024

Criticism of the inquiry 
Criticisms leveled against the inquiry have included concerns about long delays in its work (the Guardian said: "The inquiry has performed to perfection its dual function of creating the illusion of a political response, while firmly kicking the issue into the long grass"), the perceived suitability of John Mitting as chair, and the decision to allow many undercover officers giving evidence to the inquiry to remain anonymous.

In March 2018 at least 60 campaigners and their legal teams walked out of hearings examining whether the identities of undercover officers should be concealed.

A number of the CPs (Core Participants) involved in the inquiry are campaigning together. They are the Campaign Opposing Police Surveillance (COPS) and Police Spies Out of Lives.

References

Public inquiries in the United Kingdom
2015 establishments
United Kingdom commissions and inquiries